"New York" is a song by American hip hop recording artist Ja Rule, released October 27, 2004 as the second single from his sixth studio album R.U.L.E. (2004). The track, produced by Cool & Dre, features fellow New York rappers Fat Joe and Jadakiss. The song's chorus is based on Boogie Down Productions' 1990 song, "100 Guns".

The music video was directed in New York City, and features cameo appearances by many local artists. The song peaked at number 27 on the US Billboard Hot 100 chart, number 14 on US Hot R&B/Hip-Hop Songs, and number 10 on Hot Rap Songs charts respectively.

Background
Cool & Dre produced the track for rapper Fat Joe, who initially turned it down. Jadakiss was said to be interested in the track; however, Ja Rule grabbed it almost immediately. When Irv Gotti learned of the history behind who was to have the track, he mentioned it to Ja Rule, and then they offered for both Fat Joe and Jadakiss to be featured on the track.

The song contains a sample of Nkalakatha by Mandoza. Though not credited on the songs credit the song is a slowed down Mandoza's produced by Gabbie Lerroux. 

The song, or at least Ja Rule's verse, is considered a subliminal diss track aimed at gangster rapper 50 Cent and his group G-Unit. In the song Rule raps: Apprentice you're fired, you're no longer desired/So take off them silly chains, put back on your wire/I'm on fire. 50 Cent later attacked Fat Joe and Jadakiss for being a part of the song in his 2005 song "Piggy Bank".

There is a sequel to the song, "New York Is Back" on DJ Khaled's album, We the Best (2007).

The song also features an official music video with numerous cameo appearances including Remy Ma, Jennifer Lopez, N.O.R.E., Styles P, Jim Jones, DJ Clue, Irv Gotti, Angie Martinez and more.

Charts

Weekly charts

Year-end charts

References

2004 singles
Ja Rule songs
Fat Joe songs
Jadakiss songs
Songs written by Ja Rule
Songs about New York City
Song recordings produced by Cool & Dre
Gangsta rap songs
Songs written by Fat Joe
2004 songs
Def Jam Recordings singles
Songs written by Jadakiss
Diss tracks
Songs written by Cool (record producer)
Songs written by KRS-One
Songs written by Dre (record producer)